Mike Mutyaba  also referred to as Sulaiman Mutyaba(born 23 March 1991) is a Ugandan retired professional footballer who played as a forward. He usually played as an attacking midfielder on the left however he had the ability to play effectively on the right or upfront.

Club career

Bunamwaya SC
Mike Mutyaba joined the club strait from school having previously been an academy player for his local club Express FC and made his debut almost immediately.

El Merreikh
Mutyaba joins El Merreikh, In a related development, Mike Mutyaba has signed a two-year contract with Sudan giants El-Merreikh, two days after Bunamwaya SC teammate Owen Kasule joined Vietnamese side Hoang Ahn Gia Lai on another two-year deal.

"We can confirm that Mike Mutyaba has joined El-Merreikh and we have already released his International Transfer Certificate (ITC)," FUFA publicist Rogers Mulindwa told the press.

International career
He was a part of Uganda U23 team. He made his debut for senior Uganda side in 2011.

International goals
Scores and results list Uganda's goal tally first.

References

External links
 allafrica.com
 ugandasports.org
 

1991 births
Living people
Ugandan footballers
Sportspeople from Kampala
Ugandan expatriate footballers
Expatriate footballers in Sudan
Ugandan expatriate sportspeople in Sudan
Al-Merrikh SC players
Vipers SC players
Association football forwards
Uganda international footballers
Ugandan expatriate sportspeople in the Democratic Republic of the Congo
Expatriate footballers in the Democratic Republic of the Congo
TP Mazembe players
Uganda A' international footballers
2011 African Nations Championship players